Maco may refer to:

 Maco (film company), a German film company
 Maco (toy company)
 Maco, Davao de Oro, a municipality in the Philippines
 The Maco light, an allegedly paranormal event seen in Maco, North Carolina
 MACO (Military Assault Command Operations), a fictional military unit seen in Star Trek: Enterprise
 OG Maco, a rapper known for the hit single "U Guessed It"
 Maco, another name for the Marueta people
 Maco (singer), Japanese female singer-songwriter
 Malcolm Marshall, former West Indies cricketer

See also
 
 
 MAACO
 Mako (disambiguation)